Berowra  is an outer suburb of Northern Sydney located in the state of New South Wales, Australia 36 kilometres north of the Sydney central business district, in the local government area of Hornsby Shire. Berowra is south-east of the suburbs of Berowra Heights and east of Berowra Waters. The name Berowra means place of many shells, referring to the many shell middens on Berowra Creek.

Geography 
Berowra is located 44 kilometres north of the Sydney CBD and lies at an altitude of 215 metres. Surrounded by bushland, it borders the national parks of both the Berowra Valley and Ku-ring-gai Chase.

Commercial area 
Berowra is largely residential with a small retail precinct lining the Pacific Highway near the train station. In May 2007 a new shopping complex opened on Turner Road in Berowra Heights; this was a landmark development for the future prospects of the area.

Transport 
Berowra is located off the Pacific Highway. The Pacific Motorway runs to the east, between Berowra and the Ku-ring-gai Chase National Park. In January 1960 a heavy vehicle checking station opened. In December 1968 the Pacific Motorway opened from Berowra to the Hawkesbury River. As it was a toll road, toll booths were installed at Berowra adjacent to the heavy vehicle checking station. This closed when the Pacific Motorway was extended south to Wahroonga in March 1989.

Berowra railway station is located on the Main Northern line. It is served by Sydney Trains North Shore & Western Line and NSW TrainLink Central Coast & Newcastle Line services to Sydney, Hornsby, the Central Coast and Newcastle.

History 
Berowra is an Aboriginal word that means place of many shells. The Berowra area has many Aboriginal carvings.

British settlement 
One of the early land grants in the Berowra area was to John Crumpton in 1867. George Collingridge was granted  in 1880 and played a part in having the Main Northern railway line extended, so that a station was opened at Berowra in 1887. He also supported the building of a post office in 1900 and a road to Berowra Waters which opened in 1902. Berowra Post Office opened on 1 April 1897. Mary Wall was granted  of land near Goodwyn Road off the Pacific Highway in 1887. Part of her grant meant she had to be there once a week and so she would walk at night through the bush from Surry Hills and tend to her farm.

The area grew when the Pacific Highway and railway were built and settlers loved the fishing and surrounding bush. Mainly living in tents, the original settlers lived a tough existence and helped everyone. The first school was set up in Mary Wall's house before it was moved to what is now the Berowra District Hall on the corner of Berowra Waters Road and Crowley Road roundabout.

Primary schools 
Berowra and Berowra Heights share four primary schools:

 Berowra Public School (Berowra).
 Berowra Christian School (Berowra).
 Wideview Public School (Berowra Heights).
 St Bernard's Catholic Primary School (Berowra Heights)

High schools 
None

Churches 
Berowra and Berowra Heights share four churches:

 St Mark's Anglican Church (Berowra)
 Berowra Baptist Church (Berowra)
 St Bernard's Catholic Church (Berowra Heights)
 Berowra Uniting Church (Berowra Heights)

Clubs and Community Groups 

 Apex
 Berowra Musical Society 
 Berowra Toastmasters
 Berowra Rotary Club
 Lions Club
 Scouts
 Girl Guides
 The Probus club of Berowra
 Netball Club
 Soccer Club
 Football Club
 Cricket Club

Population

Demographics 
At the time the 2016 census was conducted, the population of Berowra was 4,721, consisting of 2,353 (49.9%) males and 2,365 (50.1%) females. 73.3% of residents were born in Australia, while the next most common country of birth was England at 7.1%. 85.2% of residents only spoke English at home. The most common responses for religion were No Religion (29.9%), Anglican (21.5%) and Catholic (20.8%). Of the 1,493 occupied dwellings in Berowra, 94% were freestanding houses. The median weekly household income is A$2,355 and the mean household size consists of 3.1 individuals.

Notable residents 
 Matt Dunning, rugby union player
 Margaret Preston, (former resident) artist
 Rolf de Heer, (former resident) film director
 Mel Gibson, (former resident) actor
 James Fry, author

Events 
Every year on the 2nd Sunday of August Berowra hosts the Annual Woodchop Festival. Running since 1995, this festival attracts thousands of people every year.

Restaurants 

 Absolute Thai Berowra
 Bambino's Pizza & Pasta
 Berowra RSL Club
 Berowra Village Tavern
 Berowra Chinese Restaurant
 Berowra Waters Fish Cafe
 Berowra Pizza Restaurant
 Berowra Waters Inn
 Cafe Laurella
 CoHo Berowra
 Darcies Cafe
 Golden Phoenix Berowra
 Subway
 Waterview Restaurant
 Wise Monkey Cafe

+ Takeaway outlets, bakeries and grocery stores

References

External links 
Berowra Community Home Page and Directory
The Bush Telegraph: Local newsletter for Berowra and surrounding areas
Berowra Apex: An active community service club
 
  [CC-By-SA]

Suburbs of Sydney
Hornsby Shire